Steven Lee Bucknall  (born 17 March 1966) is a retired English professional basketball player, and former head coach of British Basketball League expansion franchise London Capital.

A 1.98 m (6'6") and 97.5 kg (215 lbs.) shooting guard, Bucknall was the third English-born player in the United States' NBA and the first who actually grew up in his country of birth, where he started playing as a Junior at Crystal Palace Basketball Club in London. He played for the Los Angeles Lakers, with whom he had a brief stint after graduating from the University of North Carolina.

Prior to matriculation at the University of North Carolina, he played high school basketball for Governor Dummer Academy, now known as The Governor's Academy, which is part of the ISL (Independent School League).

He subsequently went on to play in a number of European countries including Greece, France, Italy as well as his native UK.

Prior to his retirement, Bucknall played for the bronze medal-winning English basketball team in the Melbourne Commonwealth Games in 2006. He also has a son Marcus Bucknall who plays for Mandoulides Thessaloniki. He follows his father's footsteps, playing for the All-Thassaloniki team.

Coaching history
London Capital (2007–2008)
 Lewisham Thunder Basketball club (2008–present), national champions, 2011 U18 Boys
London Capitals BBL 2007 -2008
England U18 Boys 2010–2013, achieved promotion into Division A

Playing history
London Lewisham Thunder (2016–2017)
Leicester Riders (2005–2006)
Olympique Antibes, France (2004–05)
Iraklis Thessaloniki, Greece (2003–04)
Birmingham Bullets, (2002-transferred)
Aris Thessaloniki, Greece (2001–02)
London Towers (1999–2001)
Reggio Emilia, Italy (1998–99)
Iraklis Thessaloniki, Greece (1996–98)
London Towers (1995–96)
Thames Valley Tigers (1994–95)
Le Mans, France (1993–94)
Villeurbanne, France (1992–93)
Stuttgart, Germany (1991–92)
Sunderland (1990–91)
Los Angeles Lakers, U.S. (1989–90)
Tulsa Fast Breakers (CBA), U.S. (drafted only)
Crystal Palace (1983–84) (three games only)
Crystal Palace Juniors

Honors

Championship Winner – 1995–96
Championship Runner-up – 1994–95, 1990–91
Play-off Runner-up – 1995–96, 1990–91
BBL Trophy Winner – 1999–2000, 1995–96, 1994–95
Southern Conference Winner – 2000–01, 1999–2000
National Cup Winner – 1995–96, 1990–91
National Cup Runner-up – 1994–95
England International (91 caps) Debut v Spain 1990–1252 points (15.3ppg)
League All-Star Team – 2000–01, 1999–2000, 1995–96, 1994–95, 1990–91
All-Star Game – 1999–2000, 1994–95, 1990–91
Great Britain 1988 & 1992 (22 caps)

See also
1989–90 NBA season
England national basketball team

References

External links
NBA stats at www.basketball-reference.com
Full career history at www.daveowenbasketball.co.uk

1966 births
Living people
Aris B.C. players
ASVEL Basket players
Basketball players from Greater London
Black British sportsmen
British expatriate basketball people in Germany
British expatriate basketball people in Italy
British expatriate basketball people in the United States
British expatriate basketball people in France
British expatriate basketball people in Greece
English expatriate sportspeople in Germany
English expatriate sportspeople in Italy
English expatriate sportspeople in the United States
English men's basketball players
Fabriano Basket players
Greek Basket League players
Iraklis Thessaloniki B.C. players
Leicester Riders players
Le Mans Sarthe Basket players
Los Angeles Lakers players
McDonald's High School All-Americans
Newcastle Eagles players
North Carolina Tar Heels men's basketball players
Pallacanestro Reggiana players
Parade High School All-Americans (boys' basketball)
Shooting guards
The Governor's Academy alumni
Undrafted National Basketball Association players
English expatriate sportspeople in France
English expatriate sportspeople in Greece